William G. Hartman (born April 4, 1938, in Elkins, West Virginia) is an American politician and a Democratic member of the West Virginia House of Delegates representing District 43 since January 12, 2013. Hartman served consecutively from January 2003 until January 2013 in a District 37 seat.

Education
Hartman earned his BA from West Virginia University.

Elections
2012 Redistricted to District 43 with fellow District 37 incumbent Denise Campbell, and with District 43's incumbents redistricted to District 50, Hartman and Representative Campbell were challenged in the three-way May 8, 2012 Democratic Primary where Hartman placed second with 3,240 votes (31.6%), and placed second in the three-way two-position November 6, 2012 General election with 7,243 votes (34.2%), behind incumbent Representative Campbell (D), and ahead of Republican nominee Donna Auvil.
2002 Hartman placed in the six-way 2002 Democratic Primary and was elected in the five-way two-position November 5, 2002 General election alongside incumbent Bill Proudfoot (D).
2004 Hartman and Representative Proudfoot were unopposed for the 2004 Democratic Primary and were re-elected in the five-way two-position November 2, 2004 General election.
2006 Hartman and Representative Proudfoot were unopposed for the 2006 Democratic Primary and were re-elected in the four-way two-position November 7, 2006 General election.
2008 Hartman and Representative Proudfoot were challenged in the four-way May 13, 2008 Democratic Primary where Hartman placed second with 4,469 votes (30.2%); they were unopposed for the November 4, 2008 General election where Hartman placed second with 9,364 votes (48.4%).
2010 When Representative Proudfoot retired and left a seat open, Hartman placed first in the six-way May 11, 2010 Democratic Primary with 2,416 votes (29.2%), and placed second in the three-way two-position November 2, 2010 General election with 5,954 votes (33.7%) behind Democratic nominee Denise Campbell and ahead of Republican nominee Wilda Sharp.

References

External links
Official page at the West Virginia Legislature

William Hartman at Ballotpedia
William G. Hartman at the National Institute on Money in State Politics

1938 births
Living people
Democratic Party members of the West Virginia House of Delegates
People from Elkins, West Virginia
United States Army soldiers
West Virginia University alumni
21st-century American politicians